Noé Emanuel López de León (born 22 February 1990) is a Mexican professional boxer who held the interim WBA super featherweight title in 2015.

Professional career

Lopez turned pro in 2010 and had a record 17–4–1 before challenging and beating Colombia boxer Carlos Padilla for the interim WBA super featherweight title. He was stripped of the title for not defending it against mandatory challenger Jezreel Corrales.

Professional boxing record

See also
List of world super-featherweight boxing champions

References

External links

1990 births
Living people
Mexican male boxers
Boxers from Chiapas
Super-featherweight boxers
Lightweight boxers
World super-featherweight boxing champions
World Boxing Association champions
People from Comitán